Leucine-rich repeat-containing protein 48 is a protein that in humans is encoded by the LRRC48 gene.

References

Further reading

LRR proteins